Mírzá Mihdí (‎ 1848 – June 23, 1870) was the youngest child of Baháʼí Faith founder Baháʼu'lláh and his wife Ásíyih Khánum. He was given the title G͟husn-i-Athar ("Purest Branch" or "Purer Branch").

Early life 
He was born in Tehran with the given name of Mihdí in 1848. Since birth, he held the style of Mirza as the son of an aristocrat. His father was Bahá’u’lláh, son of a court minister Mírzá `Abbás Núrí. His mother, Ásíyih Khánum was the daughter of nobility from Mazandaran. He was named after his deceased paternal uncle, who Bahá’u’lláh had been close to. Mírzá Mihdí was four when his father was arrested, their home looted, and the family reduced to near poverty. At its worst, his mother was forced to feed the children flour to satiate their hunger. In 1852, Bahá’u’lláh was exiled to Baghdad but due to his ill-health, Mírzá Mihdí was left with relatives in Tehran.

Returning to his family, 1860 - 1868 

Mírzá Mihdí was reunited with his family in 1860 and grew very close to his father. He served Bahá’u’lláh as his secretary, transcribing letters on his behalf. Mírzá Mihdí accompanied Bahá’u’lláh in His successive exiles to Istanbul, Edirne, and, finally, to Acre, Israel. Bahá’u’lláh (who described his family as a tree) entitled Mírzá Mihdí as "The Purest Branch".

Exile to Acre and death, 1868 
In the summer of 1868, Bahá’u’lláh and his family were condemned to perpetual imprisonment in the penal-colony of Acre, Israel. The family was housed in a cluster of dilapidated cells. Mírzá Mihdí occupied a cell with his mother and his sister Bahíyyih Khánum.

It was common practice for the prisoners to use the roof for exercise in the summer months. Mírzá Mihdí was pacing the roof reciting  the Ode of the Dove (a prayer revealed by his father). Wrapped in prayer, he fell through the skylight in the roof of the prison onto a crate lying on the floor below.  The family heard the crash and rushed to the scene to find Mihdí covered in blood. He was so badly injured that his clothes had to be torn from him. Prison guards allowed for a doctor to attend to him, but by that time the injuries were too severe. As he lay dying, Mírzá Mihdí told Bahá’u’lláh he wished that pilgrims (many of whom walked from Iran but were denied the chance to meet Bahá’u’lláh) would be permitted to enter Acre.

Mírzá Mihdí died with his father beside him on June 23, 1870. His father had to sell a small carpet in his cell to fund the hastily prepared funeral, that no family were permitted to attend.

Legacy 

The sudden and unexpected death of Mírzá Mihdí brought deep sadness to his parents and destroyed any morale that was left among the prisoners. His mother was so overcome with grief that family members feared she would never recover. His sister collected the blood-soaked clothes of Mihdí and other relics. These are seen in the International Archives in Israel. Baháʼu'lláh eulogized his son and connected the subsequent easing of restrictions and pilgrims' ability to visit him to Mihdí's dying prayer.

Shoghi Effendi later removed the body of Mírzá Mihdí and reinterred it alongside his mother, in the gardens below the Arc on Mount Carmel, Haifa, in an area now called the Monument Gardens. He then cabled the Baháʼís:

His resting-place now serves as a place of pilgrimage for Bahá’ís.

Appearance and personality 
In physical appearance Mírzá Mihdí grew to resemble `Abdu'l-Bahá with blue eyes, dark hair and a fair complexion but was taller. Mírzá Mihdí was remembered as gentle and self-effacing by contemporaries, winning him the affection of the exiled Bahá'í community.

See also 

Others buried in the Monument Gardens:

 Ásiyih Khánum, Baháʼu'lláh's first wife, Mirzá Mihdí's mother (also called Nawab).
 Bahíyyih Khánum, Mirzá Mihdí's elder sister.
 Munirih Khánum, wife of ʻAbdu'l-Bahá, Mirzá Mihdí's elder brother.

Notes and citations

Notes

Citations

References

External links 

 The Purest Branch
 Mírzá Mihdí The Purest Branch

Family of Baháʼu'lláh
People from Tehran
Burials in Israel
People from Acre, Israel
Iranian prisoners and detainees
1870 deaths
1848 births
Iranian emigrants to the Ottoman Empire
Prisoners and detainees of the Ottoman Empire
19th-century Iranian people